James Lee Kaat (born November 7, 1938) is an American former professional baseball player and television sports commentator. He played in Major League Baseball (MLB) as a left-handed pitcher for the Washington Senators / Minnesota Twins (–), Chicago White Sox (–), Philadelphia Phillies (–), New York Yankees (–), and St. Louis Cardinals (–). His 25-year playing career spanned four decades.

Kaat was an All-Star for three seasons and a Gold Glove winner for 16 seasons. He was the American League (AL) leader in shutouts (5) in 1962, and the AL leader in wins (25) and complete games (19) in 1966. In addition to his 283 career wins, he has three 20-win seasons. Kaat won 190 games with the Senators/Twins (winning all but one with the latter), second most in club history and most since the team moved to Minnesota; he also has the most Gold Glove Awards of any Twin with 12.

After a brief stint as a pitching coach for the Cincinnati Reds, he went on to become a sportscaster and for the next 22 years called games for the New York Yankees and the Minnesota Twins. Following a brief retirement in 2006, Jim Kaat was back in the broadcast booth calling Pool D for the 2009 World Baseball Classic in Puerto Rico, called games for NESN in 2009, and worked for the MLB Network from its inception in 2009 until August 2022.

Kaat was elected to the National Baseball Hall of Fame by the Golden Days Era Committee in 2021 and enshrined in 2022.

Biography

Early life
Kaat was the youngest of four children born to John and Nancy (Bosma) Kaat. He attended the schools of Zeeland, Michigan and is a 1956 graduate of Zeeland High School. During his high school years, he excelled at basketball and baseball.

Baseball career
Kaat attended Hope College in Holland, Michigan, and pitched for the school's Flying Dutchmen baseball team, before being signed by the Washington Senators as an amateur free agent in 1957. Kaat spent all of 1957 and 1958 in the minor leagues before breaking into the majors in 1959. After pitching in 16 games spread out over the next two seasons, Kaat became a permanent member of the pitching staff when the team moved west in 1961 to become the Minnesota Twins. On July 24, 1963 Kaat threw a complete-game shutout and hit a home run for a 5–0 Twins win over the Indians. Minnesota pitchers have only homered in the same game in which they threw a shutout three times, and Kaat did so twice; the second occurrence was on October 1, 1970.

On July 23, 1964, he gave up two home runs to Bert Campaneris, who was making his major league debut in the game. Kaat was a member of the 1965 Twins team that won the American League pennant. He started three games in the 1965 World Series against the Los Angeles Dodgers, matching up with Sandy Koufax on all three occasions, including a complete game victory in Game 2.

His best season was in 1966, when he led the league with 25 wins and 19 complete games. He finished fifth in the MVP voting and was named the American League Pitcher of the Year by The Sporting News. The National League's Sandy Koufax won the Cy Young Award by a unanimous vote; it was the last year in which only one award was given for all of Major League Baseball. Although his 1967 season was somewhat of a let down compared to 1966 (he finished 16–13 with a 3.04 ERA), he went on a tear in September and nearly pitched the Twins to another World Series appearance — cruising to a 7–0 record with a 1.51 ERA and 65 strikeouts in 65 innings pitched. However Kaat sustained a season-ending arm injury in the third inning of the second-to-last game of the season and the Boston Red Sox swept the final two games to win the American League pennant.

In 1974, he would set a record for largest gap between 20-win seasons at eight, a mark not surpassed until David Cone broke the mark in 1998. Kaat recorded his third 20-win season in 1975, when he pitched to a 20–14 record with a 3.11 ERA. This was also the only year of his career in which he received votes for the Cy Young Award, finishing fourth. Although Kaat would pitch a few games a year out of the bullpen over the course of his career, he was primarily a starting pitcher until 1979, when he became a relief pitcher in a season which he split between the Philadelphia Phillies and New York Yankees. He had been traded with Mike Buskey from the Chicago White Sox to the Phillies for Dick Ruthven, Alan Bannister and Roy Thomas on December 10, 1975. With the St. Louis Cardinals in 1982, Kaat earned his only World Series ring, working in four games out of the bullpen in the 1982 World Series.

Kaat was an All-Star three times (1962, 1966, 1975), and won the Gold Glove Award for defensive skill a record 16 consecutive times (1962–1977). His record for career Gold Gloves by a pitcher is now second to Greg Maddux's 18. Kaat used the same baseball glove for 15 seasons.

In 1983, he became the last major league player to have played in the 1950s and the last player for the original Washington Senators to retire. Kaat is one of only 29 players in baseball history to date to have appeared in Major League games in four decades. At the time of his retirement, Kaat's 25-year career was the longest of any pitcher in major league history. He is now third all-time, behind Nolan Ryan's 27 seasons and Tommy John's 26 campaigns. Kaat also set a 20th-century record by playing during the administrations of seven U.S. Presidents – Dwight D. Eisenhower, John F. Kennedy, Lyndon B. Johnson, Richard M. Nixon, Gerald R. Ford, Jr., Jimmy Carter, and Ronald Reagan. This mark was equaled by Nolan Ryan when he retired after the 1993 season, the first year of the administration of Bill Clinton.

Career statistics

Coaching 
Upon retirement as a player, Kaat served a short stint with the Cincinnati Reds as the club's pitching coach. When Pete Rose took over in 1984 as the Reds' player/manager, he made good on a promise to Kaat, his former Philadelphia Phillies teammate, and hired the former hurler for his coaching staff. Kaat would coach part of the 1984 season and all of 1985, a year in which he guided Cincinnati rookie Tom Browning to a 20–9 record. "At least I can say I had a 20-game winner every year I coached," Kaat used to joke.

Other baseball activities 
In January 2018, Jim Kaat was hired by the Minnesota Twins as a Special Assistant. Kaat's role is "to help assist Twins president Dave St. Peter in business, marketing and community initiatives".

Kaat had his number 36 retired by the Twins on July 16, 2022.

He has written a best-selling book, Still Pitching, and has started a sports management company, Southpaw Enterprises, Inc., solely representing pitchers. Kaat was inducted into the Minnesota Twins Hall of Fame in 2001.

In May 2022, Kaat released his third book, Good as Gold: My Eight Decades in Baseball.

Baseball Hall of Fame
In 2014, Kaat appeared for the second time as a candidate on the National Baseball Hall of Fame's Golden Era Committee election ballot for possible Hall of Fame consideration for 2015, which required 12 votes. He missed getting inducted by two votes. He was elected to the Hall of Fame in 2021, and was formally enshrined on July 24, 2022.

Broadcasting career

Early broadcasting career 
As was stated during the television broadcast of the seventh game of the 1965 World Series, Kaat was a broadcaster on local radio in Minnesota. He also served as an analyst for Home Team Sports during the 1981 baseball strike. Following his stint as pitching coach, he went into sports broadcasting full-time starting out as the chief baseball correspondent for Good Morning America from 1984–85.

His first full-time broadcasting job was with the Yankees was during the 1986 season, where he called around 100 games for WPIX. He only lasted one season as the Yankees replaced him with Billy Martin, who was between managing stints and who was purposely brought in to second-guess Lou Piniella. In between broadcasting stints for the Yankees, he spent six years (–) as an announcer for the Twins.

In 1986, Kaat was the backup announcer for NBC Sports' coverage of baseball with Phil Stone (for the April 19 Minnesota–California contest) and Jay Randolph (the July 14 Cincinnati–Atlanta contest). In 1988, he covered the College World Series and the MLB playoffs and World Series for ESPN and also served as an analyst for NBC's coverage of the 1988 Summer Olympics.

1990s 
Besides calling four American League Championship Series for CBS (1990–1993), Kaat served as a field reporter with Lesley Visser (1990–1992) and Andrea Joyce (1991) during the World Series. Kaat also covered three World Series Trophy presentations for CBS (1990–1992). Over the course of Game 2 of the 1992 ALCS, Kaat was stricken with a bad case of laryngitis. As a result, Johnny Bench had to come over from the CBS Radio booth and finish the game with Dick Stockton as a "relief analyst". There was talk that if Kaat's laryngitis did not get better, Don Drysdale was going to replace Kaat on TV for Game 3 while Bench would continue to work on CBS Radio. In 1993, he filled in for Lesley Visser until late August as CBS' primary field reporter after she suffered injuries in a bizarre jogging accident in New York City's Central Park.

In 1994, he was the lead analyst on Baseball Tonight for ESPN's coverage of Major League Baseball. In 1995, he was nominated for a New York Emmy Award for "On Camera Achievement".

He served his second stint as an announcer for Yankees games on the MSG Network/YES Network (–), where his straight-shooting style was much in the mode of former Yankees broadcasters Tony Kubek and Bill White. In addition, he was on the team which won the "Outstanding Live Sports Coverage – Single Program" New York Emmy for covering Dwight Gooden's no-hitter on May 14, 1996 and David Wells's perfect game on May 17, 1998.

21st century 
Towards the end of his second stint with the Yankees, his workload decreased. In 2006, he only broadcast 65 games. Despite his decreased workload, Kaat won another Emmy for on-air achievement in 2006.

In an on-air broadcast on September 10, with booth partner Ken Singleton, Kaat acknowledged his plan to end his broadcasting career. His final appearance in the booth was to be a Yankee–Red Sox game on September 15, 2006 (Kaat was also set to throw out the first pitch). However, the game was postponed due to rain. Kaat later announced that he was going to record a special farewell message to the fans, but would not return for any additional broadcasts. However, the following day, Kaat did announce one full inning of the first game of Saturday September 16's doubleheader on Fox along with Tim McCarver and Josh Lewin. During that Fox telecast he was able to say goodbye to the Yankee fans, an opportunity that the previous night's rainout had deprived him of doing on the YES Network.

After his retirement from calling Yankees games full-time, Kaat has made several single-game appearances on various networks. Kaat made a special one-inning appearance, during the third inning, on the YES Network on June 30, 2008 during a Yankees–Rangers game. He also appeared live via telephone, during a Yankees–Blue Jays game on July 13, 2008, to discuss the recent death of Bobby Murcer. He joined the TBS Sunday Baseball team, for a single game on May 4, .

In , Kaat joined the recently launched MLB Network as a color commentator for their MLB Network Showcase series. Kaat also writes a weekly on-line blog for the Yankees (YES) Network, Kaat's Korner, and contributes video blogs and interviews regularly with national and international media outlets. One of the reasons he got back into regular broadcasting was because after his wife died, Tim McCarver and Elizabeth Schumacher, his friend and business manager, urged him to get back into the game. He also called Pool D in Puerto Rico for the 2009 World Baseball Classic games for an international feed.

Kaat broadcast the 2021 American League Division Series between the White Sox and Astros for MLB Network. During Game 2, he attempted to make a joke, saying that the team should "get a 40-acre field full of them" in reference to White Sox third baseman Yoán Moncada, who is Cuban. The comment evoked an unfulfilled promise during the Reconstruction era of 40 acres and a mule to freed slaves. Kaat apologized later in the broadcast for his "insensitive, hurtful remark". On June 2, 2022, Kaat again made headlines when he referred to New York Yankees pitcher Nestor Cortés Jr. as "Nestor the Molester" during a broadcast. The next day, Cortés tweeted about Kaat, "He reached out to me and apologized for his remark last night, but he didn't need to. We all make mistakes and feel 100% there was no malice intended."

After a four decade broadcasting career, Kaat announced his retirement on August 18, 2022 effective after that day's Yankees-Blue Jays game.

Broadcasting awards and accolades 
From 1997–2005, Kaat won 7 Emmy Awards for excellence in sports broadcasting:
 1995–96 New York Emmy Award for 'Outstanding Live Sports Coverage, Single Program, Dwight Gooden's No Hitter', Jim Kaat, Analyst, May 14, 1996, MSG Network
 1996–97 New York Emmy Award for 'Outstanding Live Sports Coverage, The Battle of New York: Yankees vs. Mets', New York Yankees Baseball, Jim Kaat, Announcer, June 16, 1997, MSG Network
 1997–98 New York Emmy Award for 'Outstanding Live Sports Coverage, Single Program, Professional; David Wells Perfect Game, New York Yankees Baseball, Jim Kaat Commentator, MSG Network
 1997–98 New York Emmy Award for 'Outstanding Live Sports Coverage, Series, Professional', New York Yankees Baseball, Jim Kaat, Commentator, MSG Network
 1999–00 New York Emmy Award for 'Outstanding Live Sports Coverage, Series', New York Yankees, Jim Kaat, Announcer, April 13, 1999, MSG Network
 2004–05 New York Emmy Award for 'On-camera Achievement (Sports): Analysis/Commentary in a Sportscast, Jim Kaat, YES Network;
 2004–05 New York Emmy Award for 'Live Sports Coverage: Single Program (Professional)', New York Yankees Baseball – 2005 Opening Night, Jim Kaat, Talent, YES Network

Personal life
Kaat's marriages to his first wife, Julie, and his second wife, Linda, ended in divorce. His third wife, MaryAnn, died in July 2008 after 22 years of marriage. Kaat created a memorial fund in her name to put lights on the baseball fields in his hometown of Zeeland, Michigan, in her honor. Kaat and MaryAnn have four children and six grandchildren. Kaat married his fourth wife, Margie, in 2009.

See also

 List of Major League Baseball players who played in four decades
 List of Major League Baseball career wins leaders
 List of Major League Baseball annual wins leaders
 List of Major League Baseball career hit batsmen leaders
 List of Major League Baseball career strikeout leaders
 List of Major League Baseball all-time leaders in home runs by pitchers

References

External links
Jim Kaat at the Baseball Hall of Fame

Jim Kaat at SABR (Baseball BioProject)
Baseball Hall of Fame: Kaat's Career a Study in Consistency

– YES Network section on his retirement
Kaat's meow: Signing off after 25 memorable years behind mike

1938 births
Living people
Major League Baseball pitchers
Minnesota Twins players
Washington Senators (1901–1960) players
Chicago White Sox players
Philadelphia Phillies players
St. Louis Cardinals players
New York Yankees players
National Baseball Hall of Fame inductees
American League All-Stars
Gold Glove Award winners
American League wins champions
Baseball players from Michigan
Charleston Senators players
Chattanooga Lookouts players
Missoula Timberjacks players
Superior Senators players
Major League Baseball broadcasters
Minnesota Twins announcers
New York Yankees announcers
Olympic Games broadcasters
MLB Network personalities
YES Network
Major League Baseball pitching coaches
Cincinnati Reds coaches
Hope Flying Dutchmen baseball players
Hope College alumni
American people of Dutch descent
People from Zeeland, Michigan
American expatriate baseball players in Nicaragua